Moisés Roberto Barbosa (born 11 March 1995), simply known as Moisés, is a Brazilian footballer who plays as a left back for Russian club CSKA Moscow on loan from Internacional.

Club career

Early career
Born in São Paulo, Moisés finished his formation with Comercial-SP. He made his senior debut for the side on 13 July 2013, starting in a 0–0 home draw against XV de Piracicaba for the year's Copa Paulista.

Moisés subsequently represented Batatais and Madureira, impressing with the latter during the 2015 Campeonato Carioca.

Corinthians and loans
On 14 May 2015, it was announced that Moisés signed an 18-month contract with Corinthians, being immediately loaned to Série B side Bragantino until the end of the year. He scored his first goal as a senior on 30 October of that year, netting the game's only in an away success over Atlético Goianiense.

Returning to his parent club ahead of the 2016 season, Moisés moved to Bahia on 19 February 2016, also in a temporary deal. A regular starter, he contributed with 25 league appearances and one goal as his side achieved top level promotion.

Moisés made his debut for Corinthians on 4 February 2017, starting in a 1–0 Campeonato Paulista away win against São Bento.

CSKA Moscow
On 4 August 2022, Moisés joined Russian Premier League club PFC CSKA Moscow on loan.

Career statistics

Honours
Corinthians
Campeonato Brasileiro Série A: 2017
Campeonato Paulista: 2017

Botafogo
 Campeonato Carioca: 2018

Bahia
 Campeonato Baiano: 2019

References

External links
 

1995 births
Living people
Footballers from São Paulo
Brazilian footballers
Association football defenders
Campeonato Brasileiro Série A players
Campeonato Brasileiro Série B players
Comercial Futebol Clube (Ribeirão Preto) players
Batatais Futebol Clube players
Madureira Esporte Clube players
Sport Club Corinthians Paulista players
Clube Atlético Bragantino players
Esporte Clube Bahia players
Botafogo de Futebol e Regatas players
Sport Club Internacional players
PFC CSKA Moscow players
Russian Premier League players
Brazilian expatriate footballers
Expatriate footballers in Russia
Brazilian expatriate sportspeople in Russia